The men's individual pursuit C1 took place on 8 September 2016.

The event began with a qualifying race over 3000m. Each of the athletes competed individually in a time-trial basis. The fastest two riders raced for the gold medal and the third- and fourth-fastest riders raced for the bronze.

Preliminaries
Q: Qualifier for gold medal final
Qb: Qualifier for bronze medal final
WR: World Record
PR: Paralympic Record

Finals

Cycling at the 2016 Summer Paralympics